
Franz Karl (1 January 1888 – 18 March 1964) was a German general during World War II who commanded several divisions. He was a recipient of the Knight's Cross of the Iron Cross.

Awards and decorations

 Knight's Cross of the Iron Cross on 5 August 1940 as Generalleutnant and commander of 263. Infanterie-Division

References

Citations

Bibliography

 

1888 births
1964 deaths
People from Ebersberg (district)
People from the Kingdom of Bavaria
Lieutenant generals of the German Army (Wehrmacht)
German Army personnel of World War I
Military personnel from Bavaria
Recipients of the clasp to the Iron Cross, 1st class
Recipients of the Knight's Cross of the Iron Cross
German prisoners of war in World War II